Events from the year 1992 in Taiwan, Republic of China. This year is numbered Minguo 81 according to the official Republic of China calendar.

Incumbents
 President – Lee Teng-hui
 Vice President – Li Yuan-tsu
 Premier – Hau Pei-tsun
 Vice Premier – Shih Chi-yang

Events

January
 1 January – The establishment of Institute of Yilan County History in Yilan City, Yilan County.
 27 January – The establishment of Fair Trade Commission.

February
 12 February – The operation commencement of Cosmos Bank.
 25 February – The establishment of Taishin International Bank.

April
 28–29 April – Taiwan McDonald's bombings.

July
 31 July – The passing of Act Governing Relations between the People of the Taiwan Area and the Mainland Area.

August
 1 August – The disestablishment of Taiwan Garrison Command.
 23 August – The termination of diplomatic relation with South Korea.

September
 10 September – The upgrade of Puzi from township to county-administered city.

October
 5 October – The opening of Central Signal Station of Taiwan Railways Administration in Shizi Township, Pingtung County.

November
 7 November – The abolishment of Battle Field Administration.

December
 19 December – The 1992 Republic of China legislative election.

Births
 15 February – Cheng I-ching, table tennis player
 16 February – Nono Ku, actress and model
 23 February – Wei Chen-yang, taekwondo athlete
 2 March – Lai Pin-yu, cosplayer and member-elect of Legislative Yuan
 9 March – Dewi Chien, singer
 30 April – Chen Hao-wei, football player
 28 September – Chen Ting-yang, football player
 21 October – Vivian Sung, actress
 28 October – Lo Kuo-hua, baseball player

References

 
Years of the 20th century in Taiwan